Thomas Smyth LL.D. was an Irish Anglican priest.

The son of Thomas Smyth Bishop of Limerick,  he was born in Drumcree, County Westmeath and educated at Trinity College, Dublin. He was appointed Archdeacon of Glendalough in 1723 and served until 1751.

Notes

18th-century Irish Anglican priests
Archdeacons of Glendalough
Alumni of Trinity College Dublin
People from County Westmeath